Live at Brixton is the second live album by metal band Mastodon. It was released on April 19, 2014. Although it was originally released as a digital only release, it was later released as a Record Store Day exclusive Vinyl.

Reception
Pitchfork gave the album a positive review with Paul Thompson saying "If Mastodon never get around to a greatest hits package, Live at Brixton will do the trick".

Rolling Stone magazine listed the album #19 in the 20 best metal albums of 2013.

Chris Conaton of PopMatters rated the album 7 out of 10. Wrapping up his review with "this is a well-made concert film of a band playing at their best".

Track listing

Personnel
 Troy Sanders – bass, vocals
 Brent Hinds – lead guitar, vocals
 Bill Kelliher – rhythm guitar, samples, backing vocals
 Brann Dailor – drums, vocals

References

Mastodon (band) albums